Carrollwood Day School is a non-sectarian, co-educational, independent day school for students, from age two through high school in Tampa, Florida.

Its curriculum follows the guidelines established by the International Baccalaureate Organization. Carrollwood was the sixth school in the US authorized to offer all three levels of the IB program.

References

Schools in Tampa, Florida
Educational institutions established in 1981
Private high schools in Florida
Private middle schools in Florida
Private elementary schools in Florida
1981 establishments in Florida